The Tarlo River, a perennial river that is part of the Hawkesbury-Nepean catchment, is located in the Southern Tablelands and Southern Highlands regions of New South Wales, Australia.

Course and features
The Tarlo River rises within the Great Dividing Range, near the locality of Middle Arm east of Crookwell, and flows generally south southeast, north, and then east, joined by one minor tributary, before reaching its confluence with the Wollondilly River near Mount Penong, east of Taralga. The river descends  over its  course and it flows through the Tarlo River National Park.

See also 

 List of rivers of New South Wales (L–Z)
 List of rivers of Australia
 Rivers of New South Wales

References 

Rivers of New South Wales
Southern Highlands (New South Wales)
Upper Lachlan Shire
Wollondilly Shire